The Pebas Formation is a lithostratigraphic unit of Miocene age, found in western Amazonia. It is interpreted as representing the deposits of a lake ("Lake Pebas") or series of lakes, formed within the foreland basin of the Andes mountain belt. It is known for its abundant fossil ostracods and molluscs and an unusually diverse group of crocodylians.

Fossil content

Correlations

Laventan

Huayquerian

References

Bibliography

Further reading 
 
 Marcos C.Bissaro-Júnior, Leonardo Kerber, James L.Crowley, Ana M.Ribeiro, Renato P.Ghilardi, Edson Guilherme, Francisco R.Negri, Jonas P.Souza Filho, Annie S.Hsiou: "Detrital zircon U–Pb geochronology constrains the age of Brazilian Neogene deposits from Western Amazonia." Palaeogeography, Palaeoclimatology, Palaeoecology Volume 516, 15 February 2019, Pages 64–70 doi: 10.1016/j.palaeo.2018.11.032

Geologic formations of Brazil
Geologic formations of Colombia
Geologic formations of Ecuador
Geologic formations of Peru
Miocene Series of South America
Huayquerian
Chasicoan
Mayoan
Laventan
Friasian
Colloncuran
Santacrucian
Colhuehuapian
Neogene Brazil
Neogene Colombia
Neogene Ecuador
Neogene Peru
Fossiliferous stratigraphic units of South America
Paleontology in Brazil
Paleontology in Colombia
Paleontology in Ecuador
Paleontology in Peru
Siltstone formations
Mudstone formations
Coal formations
Lacustrine deposits